Grizzly Bay is a baylet of the San Francisco Bay, and an extension of Suisun Bay, which dips into Solano County, California. Grizzly Bay contains many sloughs, wildlife areas, and islands such as Grizzly Island, Joice Island and Morrow Island. It is also home to the Fifth Reserve Fleet, which is docked off the coast of Benicia.

Suisun Slough and Cordelia Slough empty into Grizzly Bay.

References

See also
 Hydrography of the San Francisco Bay Area

Bays of California
Bays of San Francisco Bay
Bodies of water of Solano County, California
Landforms of the San Francisco Bay Area
Tributaries of San Pablo Bay